Koueistan Khosravi (born 24 November 1986) is an Iranian footballer who plays as a defender for Kowsar Women Football League club FC Shahrdari Bam. She has been a member of the senior Iran women's national team.

References

External links

1986 births
Living people
Iranian women's footballers
Iran women's international footballers
Women's association football defenders
People from Kurdistan Province
Iranian Kurdish people
People from Saghez